Edmund Kirby Smith Hall (alternatively "Kirby Smith") is an on-campus living option at the Louisiana State University. The building was named after the United States and Confederate Army officer of the same name - and has earned the nickname "The Hospital" because of it being a 13-story building with a very drab, boxy façade.  Current rates (as of September 16, 2013) for a two-student room in Kirby Smith are $2,915 per student per semester.

Amenities
Four Person Suite: Each room has a communal living area and two bedrooms with two residents to each room.  Each suite has its own bathroom.

Government
Each floor has two resident assistants (RA). Each RA makes sure that housing policy is enforced, but is also a resident in the hall and participates in all of its activities.

Planned demolition 

In February 2022, LSU announced its plans to demolish the building. They had been wanting to do so for a long time, problems with the demand of on-campus housing meant these plans were continually postponed. The addition of Azalea Hall and Camellia Hall allowed for demolition plans to move forward. The demolition of Kirby Smith will begin in May 2022. The original plans for a "controlled implosion" have since been foregone due to budgeting issues. It will now be demolished using "high tech equipment" that will dismantle the building one floor at a time.

References 

Louisiana State University buildings and structures
University and college dormitories in the United States
1965 establishments in Louisiana